Debbie Boyd (born November, 1957 in Gainesville, Florida) is a Representative in the Florida House of Representatives. She received her associate degree in building construction from Santa Fe College in 1990.  She resides in Newberry, Florida and lives with her husband Tommy Boyd.

References

External links
Official Website of Representative Boyd

1957 births
Democratic Party members of the Florida House of Representatives
Living people
Women state legislators in Florida
21st-century American politicians
21st-century American women politicians